Murtaza Birlas  (also spelt Barlas) is one of the defining poets of modern Urdu Ghazal from Pakistan. His work has been published in respected journals and magazines of Urdu literature since the early 60s. He published four compilations of Ghazal poetry. His style comprises strong expressions, with a whole hearted commitment to the technical accuracy, that has always been required of Ghazal writers. His unique style of poetry has earned recognition from respected literary critics of Pakistan and India. His brother Mustafa Rahi was also a Ghazal poet. Murtaza Birlas published his late brother's works in 1993.

Murtaza Birlas is a retired civil servant. He resides in Bahria Town, Rawalpindi and is an active patron of literary activities.

Works
His published works are:
 Girah-e-Neem Baaz: Ghazal
 Tesha-e-Kurb: Ghazal
 Irtaash: Ghazal and Nazm
 Izteraar: Ghazal
 Chaudhveen Raat Mausam-e-Gul Kee: Ghazal and Nazm (romantic)

References

External links
Many Moods of Murtaza Birlas
Tesha-e-Kurb
Irtaash
Izteraar
Selected ghazals
An Urdu Manzil Evening with Murtaza Birlas
Murtaza Barlas

Year of birth missing (living people)
Living people
Pakistani civil servants
Urdu-language poets from Pakistan